Ubiquitin is a protein that in humans is encoded by the UBB gene.

Function 

Ubiquitin is one of the most conserved proteins known in eukaryotic organisms. Ubiquitin is required for ATP-dependent, non-lysosomal intracellular protein degradation of abnormal proteins and normal proteins with a rapid turnover. Ubiquitin is covalently bound to proteins to be degraded, and presumably labels these proteins for degradation. Ubiquitin also binds to histone H2A in actively transcribed regions but does not cause histone H2A degradation, suggesting that ubiquitin is also involved in regulation of gene expression. This gene consists of three direct repeats of the ubiquitin coding sequence with no spacer sequence. Consequently, the protein is expressed as a polyubiquitin precursor with a final amino acid after the last repeat. Aberrant form of this protein (UBB+1) has been noticed in patients with Alzheimer's disease, Down syndrome, other tauopathies (e.g. Pick's disease) and polyglutamine disease (e.g. Huntington's disease).

References

Further reading